Carlo McCormick is an American culture critic and curator living in New York City. He is the author of numerous books, monographs and catalogues on contemporary art and artists.

Pedagogic and art writing activities 
McCormick was Senior Editor of Paper.

He lectures and teaches extensively at universities and colleges around the United States on popular culture and art. His writing has appeared in Effects : Magazine for New Art Theory, Aperture, Art in America, Art News, Artforum, Camera Austria, High Times, Spin, Tokion, Vice and other magazines.

He appears in an on-camera interview in the 2017 documentary film Boom for Real: The Late Teenage Years of Jean-Michel Basquiat by Sara Driver that contains extensive coverage of Colab, The Real Estate Show, The Times Square Show and ABC No Rio.

The Downtown Show: the New York Art Scene from 1974 to 1984 
McCormick was guest curator of the exhibition The Downtown Show: the New York Art Scene from 1974 to 1984 (in consultation with Lynn Gumpert, and Marvin J. Taylor) that was held at New York University’s Grey Art Gallery and Fales Library. The exhibition examined the rich cross-section of artists and activities that coexisted and often overlapped in Lower Manhattan between 1974 and 1984. Emerging out of the deflated optimism of the Summer of Love (and energized by the enactment of the loft laws that made it legal for artists to live in downtown New York's industrial spaces) the Downtown no wave scene attracted painters, sculptors, photographers, musicians, performance art, filmmakers, and writers who could afford the then-low rent lofts and Lower East Side tenement apartments.

The Downtown Show: the New York Art Scene from 1974 to 1984 show traveled to the Andy Warhol Museum in Pittsburgh, Pennsylvania (May 20 to September 3, 2006) and the Austin Museum of Art, in Austin, Texas (November 18, 2006, to January 28, 2007). It was chosen as first place winner by the International Association of Art Critics/USA (AICA USA) for best thematic show in New York City in 2005-2006.

Other curatorial activities 
In 1985, McCormick curated the Tellus #8 USA/Germany issue of Tellus Audio Cassette Magazine. McCormick has also curated art shows for the Bronx Museum of Art, the Queens Museum of Art and the Woodstock Center for Photography, and collaborated with The Museum of Sex on their exhibition Punk Lust: Raw Provocation 1971-1985, featuring visuals chronicling the emergence of punk subculture and punk music.

References

Further reading
Carlo McCormick, The Downtown Book: The New York Art Scene, 1974–1984, Princeton University Press, 2006
Grace Glueck, The Downtown Scene", When It Was Still Dirty, The New York Times, January 13, 2006
João Ribas, Artinfo,Carlo McCormick, January 23, 2006
Carlo McCormick & Walter Robinson, (1982) Slouching Toward Avenue D, Art in America
Mairi Beautyman, AICA Announces Best Exhibitions of 2005-2006 Season, Interior Design, January 11, 2007

External links
  Carlo McCormick interview published on March 4, 2019, by New York Said Podcast  
  Carlo McCormick at MoMA on KAWS and his art collection 
  Carlo McCormick ARTE Interview concerning the history of graffiti artists in New York City

American art critics
American art historians
Living people
Cultural historians
Place of birth missing (living people)
Year of birth missing (living people)
Postmodernists
Academics from New York (state)
American art curators